Becker Group, formerly R. A. Becker & Co., was an Australian independent film and television distribution company founded by Russell Becker. It was established in 1965 and sold to Prime Television in 2007.

In 2008, a new company, Becker Film Group, was created by Richard Becker. In 2018, Becker formed a new film distribution company with Robert Slaviero, called R & R Films.

History 
Becker Group was established in 1965 as R. A. Becker & Co. by Russell Becker. 

In 2002 it took over Dendy Films and became known as Dendy/Becker; however, both continued to operate separately. It also owned OnSite Broadcasting, Moonlight Cinemas, and Dendy Cinemas, and had offices in New Zealand, Indonesia, Singapore and London.  

In April 2006 Richard Becker, the managing director and son of Russell, announced he was stepping down and the chief operating officer and finance director Tim Keens would become the managing director on 1 July 2007.  In June 2007 the group was sold to Prime Television.

Becker Film Group
In 2008 Richard Becker started a new company called Becker Film Group, and was managing director of the company.

R & R Films

In 2018, after Richard Becker had decided to "put Becker Films to the side", he asked Robert Slaviero, former CEO of Hoyts Distribution (which was sold to StudioCanal in 2012) to join him in a new venture, a distribution and consultancy company called R & R Films. The focus of the new company is Australian films, to date distributing both feature films for the cinema, such as Black Water: Abyss, H Is for Happiness, and The Wishmas Tree;and DVDs and digital media (Angel of Mine).

Films
Becker Group was involved in the production or distribution of the following films:

 Four Weddings and a Funeral (1994)
 Scream (1996)
 Two Hands (1999)
 The Blair Witch Project (1999)
 Emma (1996)
 FairyTale: A True Story (1997)
 Rabbit Proof Fence (2002)
 Margin Call (2011)
 Amélie (2001)
 Brassed Off (1997)
 Black Dog (1998)
 An American Werewolf in Paris (1997)
 Enigma (2001)
 Dungeons & Dragons (2000)
 Swingers (1996)
 Vera Drake
 A Simple Plan
 Primary Colors
 Supersize Me
 Wonder Boys (2000)
 Waking Ned Devine (1998)
 Candy (2006)
 Control
 Like Minds
 December Boys
 Feed

References

External links
 

Film distributors of Australia
Mass media companies established in 1965